Charles George Mogged (born February 22, 1932) was an American politician in the state of Iowa.

Mogged was born in Altamont, South Dakota. He attended University of Illinois at Urbana–Champaign and is a realtor. He served in the Iowa State Senate from 1969 to 1971 as a Republican.

References

1932 births
Living people
People from Deuel County, South Dakota
University of Illinois College of Agriculture, Consumer, and Environmental Sciences alumni
Businesspeople from Iowa
Republican Party Iowa state senators